The robe de style describes a style of dress popular in the 1920s as an alternative to the straight-cut chemise dress.

The style was characterised by its full skirts. The bodice could be fitted, or straight-cut in the chemise manner, with a dropped waist, but it was the full skirt that denoted the robe de style. Sometimes the fullness was supported with petticoats, panniers, or hoops.

The robe de style was a signature design of the couturier Jeanne Lanvin. Other couture houses known for their versions of the robe de style included Boué Soeurs, Callot Soeurs, Doeuillet and Lucile.

References

Dresses
1920s fashion
History of clothing (Western fashion)